Ralph Peters (November 19, 1853 – October 9, 1923) was an American railroad executive who served as the president of the Long Island Rail Road.

Early life
Peters was born in Atlanta, Georgia on November 19, 1853.  He was one of nine children born to Mary Jane (née Thompson) Peters (1830–1911) and Richard Peters (1810–1889), a railroad executive who was one of the founders of Atlanta.  Among his siblings was Richard, Edward, and Nellie, who also became prominent.

His paternal grandfather was Richard Peters, a reporter of Decisions to the U.S. Supreme Court, and his great-grandfather was Continental Congressman Richard Peters, a Pennsylvania jurist.  His maternal grandfather was Dr. Joseph Thompson, an early settler and doctor.

Peters graduated from the University of Georgia (UGA) in Athens, Georgia, with a Bachelor of Arts in 1872.

Career
Peters was elected president of the LIRR in April 1905.

He died at his home in Garden City, Long Island on October 9, 1923.

References

External links

1853 births
1923 deaths
20th-century American railroad executives
Long Island Rail Road people
University of Georgia alumni
Businesspeople from Atlanta